Diflucortolone (INN), or difluocortolone, is a corticosteroid.

See also 
 Diflucortolone valerate

References 

Organofluorides